CIND-FM, branded as Indie88, is an FM radio station in Toronto, Ontario, Canada, broadcasting at 88.1 MHz. The station, which broadcasts an adult album alternative format, had its "soft launch" on July 31, 2013, and had its official launch on September 3, 2013.

The station is the first entry into the Toronto market for Central Ontario Broadcasting, which also owns CFJB-FM and CKMB-FM in the outlying city of Barrie. Indie88, as the station is branded, places a priority on on-air and online interaction with its audience.

Indie88's offices and studios are located on Hanna Avenue in Toronto's Liberty Village, while its transmitter is located on top of First Canadian Place in Toronto's Financial District.

History
On September 11, 2012, the Canadian Radio-television and Telecommunications Commission (CRTC) approved Rock 95 Broadcasting Ltd.'s application to operate on 88.1 MHz, which was formerly used by CKLN-FM from 1983 to 2011. Staffing announcements made before the station's launch included Megan Bingley (general manager), Adam Thompson (program director), Alan Cross, former announcer and program director of CFNY-FM, and Raina Douris, a broadcast personality formerly associated with CFNY and CBC Radio 3.

CIND-FM broadcast a full 24-hour online music stream throughout the period between its licensing date and its formal launch. On July 25, 2013, the station announced its formal launch date of July 31 at noon; at the same time, the station replaced its online stream and began test broadcasts on 88.1 FM, stunting with a loop of "Never Gonna Give You Up" by Rick Astley (in a reference to the Rickroll meme).

The first song played on the station on its July 31 launch was Arcade Fire's "Ready to Start".

The July 31 date, however, was a soft launch for the station; throughout August, the station aired a continuous music format with no hosted programming except for "Throne of Glory", an afternoon drive program in which a guest personality was invited to play music of their own choosing. Cross hosted the first "Throne of Glory" on August 1; other personalities who hosted throughout the month include Hannah Georgas, Joel Plaskett, Adam van Koeverden, Wade MacNeil, Born Ruffians, Silversun Pickups, k-os, Torquil Campbell, METZ, July Talk, Raina Douris, The New Pornographers, Matt Mays, Jay Ferguson, Dave Hodge, Dan Mangan, Toronto Star music critic Ben Rayner, Tokyo Police Club, Matthew Good, Hollerado, Ed the Sock and Liana K (Steven and Liana Kerzner), former CFNY personality Dave Bookman and former CFNY program director and personality Don Berns.

The station officially launched on September 3 with its full complement of on-air personalities and regular features; the station's regular schedule included Douris, Bookman, Brian Bailey, Candice Knihnitski, Matt Hart and Carlin Burton. Cross was also heard on the station as a contributing personality, voicing some of the station's identification bumpers and hosting a weekday programming feature called "Crackle and Pop" in which he played rare and classic songs from his own archive of vinyl singles, until he rejoined CFNY in August 2014. The station has also since added Brent Albrecht and Sarah Burke to its roster.

On November 1, 2013, the CRTC approved an application by the station to increase the average effective radiated power (ERP) of CIND-FM from 532 to 2,100 watts (maximum ERP increasing from 875 watts to 4,000 watts) and to decrease the effective height of antenna above average terrain (EHAAT) from 328.4 to 281 metres. In the most recent available Numeris ratings, the station held a 1.3 share of the Toronto radio audience, up from 0.8 in the prior ratings period.

On September 13, 2014, the station held the "Indie88 Birthday Bash" to celebrate its first birthday. The show, which took place at Toronto's Opera House concert hall, featured live performances by Lowell, The Darcys and Dan Mangan.

In 2015, former CBC Radio 3 host Lana Gay joined the station, while in early 2016, Bailey departed for reasons unknown.

After a months-long transitional period, Indie88 began its new regular schedule on April 11, 2016. Douris moved from afternoons to join Matt Hart as new co-host of the morning show, with Candice stepping back to report only news and weather, in light of her impending maternity leave. In the afternoon slot vacated by Douris, Lana Gay was appointed the new permanent afternoon drive host.

Douris left the station in fall 2016 to join CBC Radio 2, with Knihnitski returning as Hart's morning cohost. In 2017, former CFNY-FM personality Josie Dye joined the station as cohost of the morning show with Hart and Burton.

Bookman died on May 20, 2019, approximately one month after suffering an aneurysm which had left him in intensive care. On May 29, the station aired a special fundraising radiothon, "A Day to Make Music Count", to raise money in his memory for MusiCounts, the music education initiative of the Canadian Academy of Recording Arts and Sciences. The broadcast raised over 69,000, significantly exceeding the station's 50,000 goal.

References

External links

 

IND
Radio stations established in 2013
2013 establishments in Ontario